CAT or Coding Analysis Toolkit is a web-based suite of CAQDAS tools. It is free and open source software, and is developed by the Qualitative Data Analysis Program of the University of Pittsburgh

CAT is able to import Atlas.ti data, but also has an internal coding module. It was designed to use keystrokes and automation as opposed to mouse clicks, to speed up CAQDAS tasks.

See also
 Computer-assisted qualitative data analysis software

External links
 Coding Analysis Toolkit

Free QDA software
Cross-platform free software